Rowland Stephenson was a British Tory  politician for a Cumberland constituency.

He was M.P. for Carlisle from 1787 to 1790. He died on 30 September 1807.

Notes

1728 births
1807 deaths
Tory MPs (pre-1834)
Members of the Parliament of Great Britain for English constituencies
British MPs 1784–1790
Members of the Parliament of Great Britain for Carlisle